The F160 is a  60° V6 gasoline engine that displaces . It utilizes a turbocharger for each cylinder bank, twin intercoolers and direct injection. The engine is designed by Maserati and assembled by Ferrari; specifically, the engine blocks are cast and machined to Ferrari's approved specifications respectively in Chrysler's Kokomo, Indiana and Trenton Engine Plant, then shipped to Modena, Italy for assembly by Ferrari. This engine shares bore and combustion chamber design, the same valves control technology (i.e. roller finger followers and four cam phasers), the same twin turbocharging approach and direct injection-ignition system with Ferrari F154 engine. The engine auxiliaries are identical (alternator, starter motor and power steering pump) or very similar (variable displacement oil pump). The difference of F160 from F154: F160 engine block is made by high pressure die cast (HPDC) process which is extremely suitable for high volume production. However, it is open deck type and can't endure to high specific power in HP/liter. F160 doesn't have an overboost function. Ferrari was responsible for design and bench testing of this engine.

Applications

Maserati

References 

Gasoline engines by model
V6 engines
Maserati